Xing Zhaolin (born 22 July 1997) is a Chinese actor, model and singer. He is best known for his roles as Yue Qi in Princess Agents and Mo Liancheng in The Eternal Love.

Filmography

Film

Television series

Discography

Awards and nominations

References

External links
 

1997 births
21st-century Chinese male actors
Living people
Chinese male television actors
Male actors from Henan
People from Zhengzhou